The Norseman Xtreme Triathlon is a non-Ironman branded triathlon, point to point, race held in Norway annually. The distances are equivalent to those of an Ironman race with the swim starting from the loading bay of a car ferry, through the water of the Hardanger fjord to the local town, Eidfjord. At Eidfjord the competitors transition onto their bikes and then cycle 180 km through the mountains, the first 40 km of which is uphill (reaching 1200 m above sea level). After transition two (at Austbygdi, 190 m above sea level), the competitors then run 42.2 km of which the first 25 km (to Rjukan) are flat and following this they end up climbing the local mountain, Gaustatoppen, 1,880 m above sea level.

The race is "unsupported" so competitors need to have personal back up crews that follow them with cars to provide them with food and drink. The support crews also have to accompany their competitor up the final mountain climb due to the inherent dangers of being highly fatigued on a mountain. During this final mountain climb competitors are required to carry a backpack containing emergency food and clothing should the weather turn, whilst they are on the mountain.

Weather and water 

Weather conditions, strict health checks, and deadlines determine whether the race can be followed into the mountains and those that finish are given a black finishers top and take on the name "Norsemen". Those that do not make the cut-off time but complete the distance on a lower alternative route are given a white finishers top.

The water temperature in Eidfjord is a challenge to the organizers. In 2015 the water temperature was measured to 10 degrees celsius. The safety team then decided to make the swim 1900 meters instead of 3800 meters. After the race, the safety crew decided to start a "Cold Water Research Project", which will continue for several years including one or more PhD degrees in progress. The studies is led by Jonny Hisdal and Jørgen Melau. Other than cold water studies, the group also has started studies on biomarkers, lung functions and heart function. In 2019 there is a huge research effort at Norseman,  and the research group has published their first scientific papers.

Participants 

The number of participants is limited to a certain number of competitors (290 for 2020; 250 are invited, from sponsors, media and the majority from a draw; around 40 from qualified XTRI world tour races world championship athletes ). Approximately 40% of the participants are from outside Norway; and about 15% are female. During the period 2003-2005, a total of 175 women (10.6%) and 1,852 men (89.4%) successfully finished the race.

Norseman triathlon first took place in 2003 with 21 individuals at the starting line. The race record (full swimming distance) is 09:52:10 by Lars Christian Vold (Norway) in 2017  for men and 11:16:10 by Mette Pettersen Moe (Norway) in 2018 for women.

Winners

External links

Coordinates
Start 
Transition 1 
Transition 2 
Finish

See also 
 Xtreme triathlon

References 

Triathlon competitions
Sports competitions in Norway